Archduke Charles Joseph of Austria (Carl Josef Emanuel Johann Nepomhk Anton Prokop; 1 February 1745 – 18 January 1761) was the second son of the Habsburg ruler Empress Maria Theresa I and her husband, Francis of Lorraine.

Life
Charles Joseph was the favourite son of Maria Theresa and Francis. He is known to have hated his older brother, the future Holy Roman Emperor Joseph II. He ridiculed him for his haughtiness and thought himself to be more deserving of the Crown of the Holy Roman Empire because he was the first son born to Maria Theresa during her reign as Empress. Charles Joseph often said that he meant to contend with his brother for the imperial crown.

In contrast to his older brother Joseph, who later became Holy Roman Emperor , he was considered extroverted and open-minded. The boy soon became his parents' favorite son and, with his charm and intelligence, won the affection and respect of his siblings and the entire court.

Death
The rivalry between the brothers was ended by Charles Joseph's premature death from smallpox, two weeks before his sixteenth birthday. While his mother was sitting by his bed in tears, Charles Joseph told her:

You should not weep for me, dear mother, for had I lived, I would have brought you many more tears!

Charles Joseph is buried in the Imperial Crypt in Vienna. His heart was buried separately in the Habsburg Crypt in the Loreto chapel of the Augustinian Church in Vienna.

Ancestry

References

Bibliography 
 Mahan, J. Alexander: Maria Theresa of Austria, READ BOOKS 2007 

1745 births
1761 deaths
Deaths from smallpox
18th-century Austrian people
Knights of the Golden Fleece of Austria
House of Habsburg-Lorraine
Austrian princes
Children of Maria Theresa
Burials at the Imperial Crypt
Burials at St. Stephen's Cathedral, Vienna
Sons of emperors
Royalty and nobility who died as children
Sons of kings